The Graham Star is a weekly newspaper based in Robbinsville, North Carolina covering Graham County, North Carolina.

The staff consists of Tere Moore, Advertising, Carol Borrelli, Reporter/Webmaster, Debbie Buchanan, Office Manager, Scharlene Wesley, Sports, Neal Wachob, Circulation, Photographers: Byron Housley & Art Miller.

References

Weekly newspapers published in North Carolina
Graham County, North Carolina